The Principality of Smolensk (eventually Grand Principality of Smolensk) was a Kievan Rus' lordship from the 11th to the 16th century. Until 1127, when it passed to Rostislav Mstislavich, the principality was part of the land of Kiev. The principality gradually came under Lithuanian influence and was incorporated into the Grand Duchy of Lithuania in 1404. The principality was reorganized into the Smolensk Voivodeship in 1508. The Grand Duchy of Moscow controlled the city from 1514 to 1611, then it was recaptured by the Polish–Lithuanian Commonwealth. Tsardom of Russia recaptured the city in 1654.

History

Descendants of Grand Prince Iaroslav I of Kiev (died 1054) ruled the principality until 1125. Following the death of Vladimir Monomakh, Grand Prince of Kievan Rus', Vladimir's son Mstislav I Vladimirovich became the Rus' over-king and Mstislav's own son Rostislav Mstislavich became Prince of Smolensk (ruled 1125–1160). The principality gained its own Orthodox bishopric under the Bishop of Smolensk in 1136. The principality contained a number of other important cities that usually possessed subordinate status, notable among them Bryansk, Vyazma and Mozhaysk.

Rostislav's descendants ruled the principality until 1404. Around 1339, the principality came under the influence of the Grand Duchy of Lithuania. The relationship was complex. In 1355, Algirdas, Grand Duke of Lithuania, attacked Smolensk and captured Rzhev, Bely, Mstsislaw, Toropets. The Princes of Smolensk leaned towards the Grand Duchy of Moscow for alliance against Lithuania, but in 1368 joined Algirdas in his campaign against Moscow. Smolensk later fought alongside Moscow against Mikhail II of Tver in 1372–1374 and against the Golden Horde in the Battle of Kulikovo (1380). 

In 1386, Prince  was killed in the Battle of the Vikhra River against the Lithuanians when he supported Andrei of Polotsk and his rebellion against his younger half-brother Jogaila. However, Skirgaila, who commanded the Lithuanians in battle, was married to Sviatoslav's niece and allowed Yury of Smolensk to succeed his father. In 1395, Grand Duke Vytautas of Lithuania took Smolensk and installed his governor there. Four years later, Vytautas was routed by the Tatars in the Battle of the Vorskla River. In 1401, Yury and Oleg Korotopol of Ryazan made use of his plight to retake Smolensk and Bryansk. Vytautas attempted to retake Smolensk in 1401 and 1403. In 1404, boyars of Smolensk opened the city gates to Vytautas and surrendered the city in 1404.

The Grand Duchy of Moscow under Vasili III captured Smolensk in 1514, but lost it again 1611 during the Polish–Muscovite War of 1605–1618 as a result of the Siege of Smolensk (1609–1611). The area was incorporated into the Polish–Lithuanian Commonwealth as the resurrected Smolensk Voivodeship. In the 17th century, the Rus' under Russian control attempted to bring the city into their expanding state again, and despite defeat in the "Smolensk War" (1632–1634) the Tsardom of Russia captured the city in 1654 at a time when the revolt of the Dnieper Cossacks in the Khmelnytsky Uprising (1648–1657) partially distracted the Commonwealth.

Economy
The famous trade route from the Varangians to the Greeks passed through the principality and was an important source of income for its rulers. The trade with Riga and Visby developed in the second half of 12th and 13th centuries. Wax was the main export followed by honey and furs; the main imports from Europe were textiles and later, salt, delicacies and wine.

List of rulers

References
 Franklin, Simon, and Shepard, Jonathan, The Emergence of Rus, 750–1200, (Longman History of Russia, Harlow, 1996)
 Martin, Janet, Medieval Russia, 980–1584, (Cambridge, 1995)

External links
 Medieval Lands Project

Smolensk
Medieval Russia
Medieval Belarus
Former principalities
1500s disestablishments in Europe